The Slovenian Second Football League ( or commonly 2. SNL) is the second highest football league in Slovenia. The league was formed in 1991 and is operated by the Football Association of Slovenia.

Format and rules
In its inaugural season (1991–92), the Slovenian Second League was divided into two regional groups (East and West), with both winners directly promoted to the Slovenian PrvaLiga. In 1992, a unified league was formed with 16 clubs playing the round-robin system, which lasted until 2003. Two clubs were usually promoted, while the number of those relegated varied with the number of divisions in the Slovenian Third League. In 2003, the league was reduced to twelve teams and only the champion was directly promoted to PrvaLiga, as additional promotion play-offs were introduced for the second place. In 2005 the league was further reduced to ten teams, which played the triple round-robin format.

In 2017, the competition returned to the old system with 16 clubs, used between 1992 and 2003. Each club plays every other club twice, once at home and once away, for a total of 30 matchdays. Teams receive three points for a win, one point for a draw, and no points for a loss. The winner is promoted to the Slovenian PrvaLiga, the second-placed team is qualified for promotion play-offs, while the bottom two teams are relegated to the Slovenian Third League.

2022–23 teams

Aluminij
Beltinci
Bilje
Bistrica
Brinje Grosuplje
Dob
Fužinar
Ilirija 1911
Jadran Dekani
Krka
Krško
Nafta 1903
Primorje
Rogaška
Rudar Velenje
Triglav Kranj

Winners
Source:

Top scorers

Awards
Player of the Year awards are presented by the Union of Professional Football Players of Slovenia (SPINS) since 2018.
2017–18: Luka Bobičanec (Mura)
2018–19: Anel Hajrić (Radomlje)
2019–20: Not awarded
2020–21: Not awarded
2021–22: Not awarded

Notes

References

External links
Official website 
2. SNL fixtures and table at Soccerway

 
Sports leagues established in 1991
1991 establishments in Slovenia
2
Second level football leagues in Europe